INS Agray (P36) was an Abhay class corvette in service with the Indian Navy. The ship was decommissioned on 27 January 2017.

References 

Abhay-class corvettes